Hannah Waddingham (born 28 July 1974) is an English actress and singer. She is best known for playing Rebecca Welton in the comedy series Ted Lasso (2020–present), for which she won the Primetime Emmy Award for Outstanding Supporting Actress in a Comedy Series in 2021 and the Critics' Choice Television Award for Best Supporting Actress in a Comedy Series in 2021 and 2022. She has also appeared in a number of West End shows, including Spamalot, the 2010 Regent's Park revival of Into the Woods, and The Wizard of Oz as the Wicked Witch of the West; and has received three Olivier Award nominations for her work. 

Her other work includes appearing as an ensemble member in the 2012 film adaptation of Les Misérables, and joining the cast of the fifth season of the HBO series Game of Thrones as Septa Unella in 2015. She co-starred in the 2018 British psychological thriller Winter Ridge, and has had a supporting role on the series Sex Education since 2019.

Early life and education
Waddingham was born in Wandsworth in London. Her mother, Melodie Kelly, was an opera singer, as were both her maternal grandparents. Her mother joined the English National Opera when Waddingham was eight years old, and she grew up around the theatre.

Waddingham is a graduate of the Academy of Live and Recorded Arts. She has a four octave vocal range. She started out in dinner theatre, performing in the interactive comedy Joni and Gina's Wedding.

Career

Stage career
Waddingham has been a stage actress on both London's West End and New York's Broadway. She performed as Starbird in Space Family Robinson (Julian & Stephen Butler, 2002) and Suzanne Valadon in Lautrec.

Waddingham portrayed the Lady of the Lake in Spamalot, both in the London production and then on Broadway. She received an Olivier Award nomination for the role. She received outstanding reviews for her portrayal of Desirée Armfeldt in Trevor Nunn's revival of A Little Night Music, including being described by one critic as the "Joanna Lumley of musical theatre". Waddingham subsequently received a further Olivier Award nomination in 2010 for Best Actress in a Musical for her performance in Night Music.

In mid-2010, Waddingham played the Witch in the production of Into the Woods at London's Open Air Theatre. She originated the role of The Wicked Witch of the West in the West End production of The Wizard of Oz, which opened on 1 March 2011 at the London Palladium and was the first to perform the new Lloyd Webber and Rice song "Red Shoes Blues". She left the production on 4 September 2011. Waddingham won the whatsonstage.com Theatergoers Choice Award for Best Supporting Actress in a Musical for her performance.

Waddingham appeared in the concert premiere of Styles and Drew's Soho Cinders at the Queens Theatre, London in 2011, and was replaced by Jenna Russell for the show's first fully staged production in 2012.

In 2012, Waddingham starred in Chichester Festival Theatre's revival of Kiss Me, Kate. The show transferred to the Old Vic Theatre on London's South Bank in November 2012.

Screen career

In 2011, Waddingham appeared in Season 4, Episode 3 of the hit BBC sitcom, Not Going Out. She played the role of Jane, an actress in an adult film being recorded in the show.

She had a small role in the 2012 film Les Misérables, and in 2014, starred on the ITV comedy Benidorm.

Waddingham portrayed the "Shame Nun", Septa Unella, in season 5 and 6 of Game of Thrones. She started filming nine weeks after giving birth to her daughter, and did her own stunts for a scene in which she is waterboarded. She was given the role's iconic "shame bell" as a parting gift. She also has a recurring role on the Netflix series Sex Education as Jackson's overbearing mother, Sophia Marchetti.

Since 2020, Waddingham has portrayed Rebecca Welton, the owner of AFC Richmond on the Apple TV+ series Ted Lasso. The show has been praised for its "refreshing" portrayal of a supportive female friendship between Rebecca and Juno Temple's character, Keeley. She does her own singing in the season one episode "Make Rebecca Great Again" and the season two episodes "Carol of the Bells" and "No Weddings and a Funeral". In 2021, she won the Primetime Emmy Award for Outstanding Supporting Actress in a Comedy Series and the Critics' Choice Television Award for Best Supporting Actress in a Comedy Series for the role.

Waddingham also appears as the character Mother Witch in Hocus Pocus 2, Disney's sequel to Hocus Pocus released on Disney+ on 30 September 2022. The actor's time on screen has been described as an "Oscar-worthy performance" and "[F]rom the moment she enters, she commands the screen with unquestionable authority."

She will portray Lady Bellaston in the ITV drama miniseries Tom Jones, based on Henry Fielding's 1749 novel.

On 22 February 2023, it was confirmed that Waddingham would co-host the Eurovision Song Contest 2023 in Liverpool, alongside Alesha Dixon and Ukrainian singer Julia Sanina, with Graham Norton joining them to present the grand final. In March 2023, Waddingham was announced as part of the cast for Mission: Impossible – Dead Reckoning Part Two.

Recordings 
In 2000, Waddingham played the role of Christine in the Andrew Lloyd Webber and Ben Elton musical The Beautiful Game in London's West End.  In October 2000, Waddingham (billed simply as "Hannah"), released a single of the song "Our Kind of Love" from the production. The single peaked at No. 41 in the UK charts.

She later sang the role of Starbird on the soundtrack recording of Space Family Robinson (composers: Julian Butler & Stephen Butler), released by Pop! Records in May 2002, coinciding with the stage production (also featuring Waddingham as Starbird) which ran for three weeks at London's Pleasance Theatre.

Personal life
Waddingham was previously in a relationship with Italian businessman Gianluca Cugnetto. Their daughter (born 2014) has an autoimmune disease, Henoch–Schönlein purpura. She keeps her Emmy award in her daughter's bedroom to remind her that "mummy will only ever be away when it's for a really, blooming good reason."

Filmography

Film

Television

Theatre

Awards and nominations

References

External links
 
 

1974 births
20th-century English actresses
21st-century English actresses
Alumni of the Academy of Live and Recorded Arts
Actresses from London
English film actresses
English musical theatre actresses
English stage actresses
English television actresses
English voice actresses
Living people
Outstanding Performance by a Supporting Actress in a Comedy Series Primetime Emmy Award winners
People from Wandsworth